Tröchtelborn is a municipality in the district of Gotha, in Thuringia, Germany.

References

Gotha (district)